Sevilla, officially the Municipality of Sevilla,  is a 5th class municipality in the province of Bohol, Philippines. According to the 2020 census, it has a population of 11,376 people.

The town of Sevilla, Bohol celebrates its fiesta on December 12, in honor of the patron saint Our Lady of Guadalupe.

Geography

Barangays
Sevilla comprises 13 barangays:

Climate

Demographics

Economy

References

Further reading

External links
 [ Philippine Standard Geographic Code]
Sevilla

Municipalities of Bohol